The Braille pattern dots-45 is a 6-dot braille cell with the top and middle right dots raised, or an 8-dot braille cell with the top and upper middle right dots raised. It is represented by the Unicode code point U+2818, and in Braille ASCII with a caret: ^.

Unified Braille

In unified international braille, the braille pattern dots-45 is used as a format or abbreviation sign, or as otherwise needed.

Table of unified braille values

Other braille

Plus dots 7 and 8

Related to Braille pattern dots-45 are Braille patterns 457, 458, and 4578, which are used in 8-dot braille systems, such as Gardner-Salinas and Luxembourgish Braille.

Related 8-dot kantenji patterns

In the Japanese kantenji braille, the standard 8-dot Braille patterns 56, 156, 456, and 1456 are the patterns related to Braille pattern dots-45, since the two additional dots of kantenji patterns 045, 457, and 0457 are placed above the base 6-dot cell, instead of below, as in standard 8-dot braille.

Kantenji using braille patterns 56, 156, 456, or 1456

This listing includes kantenji using Braille pattern dots-45 for all 6349 kanji found in JIS C 6226-1978.

  - 比

Variants and thematic compounds

Variants

  -  比 + selector 4  =  此

Directional thematic compounds

  -  比 + う/宀/#3  =  上
  -  比 + 龸  =  下
  -  比 + 宿  =  中
  -  比 + 数  =  右
  -  比 + ゐ/幺  =  左
  -  比 + き/木  =  北
  -  比 + み/耳  =  南
  -  比 + ひ/辶  =  東
  -  比 + に/氵  =  西

Other thematic compounds

  -  比 + は/辶  =  母
  -  selector 1 + 比 + は/辶  =  毋
  -  比 + な/亻  =  入
  -  比 + へ/⺩  =  出
  -  比 + ⺼  =  互
  -  比 + ら/月  =  亙
  -  比 + れ/口  =  凸
  -  比 + 囗  =  凹
  -  比 + や/疒  =  良
  -  比 + つ/土  =  貫
  -  比 + け/犬  =  大
  -  比 + そ/馬  =  小
  -  比 + た/⽥  =  尺
  -  比 + ふ/女  =  屯
  -  比 + と/戸  =  斗
  -  比 + を/貝  =  斤
  -  比 + く/艹  =  升
  -  比 + 火  =  丈
  -  比 + も/門  =  勺
  -  比 + ぬ/力  =  匁
  -  selector 1 + 比 + ぬ/力  =  匆
  -  比 + り/分  =  里
  -  比 + え/訁  =  高
  -  比 + か/金  =  可
  -  比 + め/目  =  亀

Compounds of 比

  -  ふ/女 + 比  =  妣
  -  と/戸 + 比  =  屁
  -  よ/广 + 比  =  庇
  -  て/扌 + 比  =  批
  -  日 + 比  =  昆
  -  き/木 + 日 + 比  =  棍
  -  火 + 日 + 比  =  焜
  -  ち/竹 + 日 + 比  =  箟
  -  心 + 日 + 比  =  菎
  -  せ/食 + 日 + 比  =  鯤
  -  に/氵 + 比  =  混
  -  た/⽥ + 比  =  毘
  -  比 + 日  =  皆
  -  て/扌 + 比 + 日  =  揩
  -  き/木 + 比 + 日  =  楷
  -  な/亻 + 比 + 日  =  偕
  -  え/訁 + 比 + 日  =  諧
  -  そ/馬 + 比  =  鹿
  -  つ/土 + そ/馬 + 比  =  塵
  -  に/氵 + そ/馬 + 比  =  漉
  -  む/車 + そ/馬 + 比  =  轆
  -  か/金 + そ/馬 + 比  =  鏖
  -  く/艹 + そ/馬 + 比  =  麁
  -  へ/⺩ + そ/馬 + 比  =  麈
  -  の/禾 + そ/馬 + 比  =  麋
  -  こ/子 + そ/馬 + 比  =  麌
  -  き/木 + そ/馬 + 比  =  麓
  -  囗 + そ/馬 + 比  =  麕
  -  囗 + 比  =  麗
  -  な/亻 + 囗 + 比  =  儷
  -  に/氵 + 囗 + 比  =  灑
  -  そ/馬 + 囗 + 比  =  驪
  -  や/疒 + う/宀/#3 + 比  =  崑
  -  心 + 龸 + 比  =  枇
  -  へ/⺩ + 宿 + 比  =  琵
  -  ま/石 + 宿 + 比  =  砒
  -  の/禾 + 宿 + 比  =  秕
  -  ち/竹 + 宿 + 比  =  箆
  -  ち/竹 + 龸 + 比  =  篦
  -  の/禾 + う/宀/#3 + 比  =  粃
  -  い/糹/#2 + 宿 + 比  =  紕
  -  心 + 宿 + 比  =  蓖
  -  そ/馬 + 宿 + 比  =  豼
  -  そ/馬 + 龸 + 比  =  貔

Compounds of 此

  -  き/木 + 比  =  柴
  -  ま/石 + 比  =  砦
  -  比 + 比  =  些
  -  比 + い/糹/#2  =  雌
  -  を/貝 + 比 + selector 4  =  貲
  -  囗 + 比 + selector 4  =  觜
  -  や/疒 + 比 + selector 4  =  疵
  -  め/目 + 比 + selector 4  =  眦
  -  れ/口 + 比 + selector 4  =  呰
  -  め/目 + 宿 + 比  =  眥

Compounds of 上, 下, and 中

  -  selector 1 + 比 + 龸  =  卞
  -  つ/土 + 比 + 龸  =  圷
  -  つ/土 + 比 + う/宀/#3  =  垰
  -  て/扌 + 比 + 龸  =  抃
  -  き/木 + 比 + 龸  =  梺
  -  も/門 + 比 + 龸  =  閇
  -  ち/竹 + 比 + 龸  =  雫
  -  け/犬 + 比 + 宿  =  狆
  -  ひ/辶 + 比 + 宿  =  迚

Compounds of 右, 左, 北, 南, 東, and 西

  -  な/亻 + 比 + 数  =  佑
  -  せ/食 + 比 + 数  =  醢
  -  selector 1 + 比 + に/氵  =  襾
  -  れ/口 + 比 + み/耳  =  喃
  -  心 + 比 + み/耳  =  楠
  -  ひ/辶 + 比 + み/耳  =  遖
  -  て/扌 + 比 + ひ/辶  =  揀
  -  き/木 + 比 + ひ/辶  =  棟
  -  心 + 比 + ひ/辶  =  楝
  -  ゑ/訁 + 比 + ひ/辶  =  諫
  -  せ/食 + 比 + ひ/辶  =  鰊
  -  れ/口 + 比 + に/氵  =  哂
  -  つ/土 + 比 + に/氵  =  堙
  -  は/辶 + 比 + に/氵  =  廼
  -  き/木 + 比 + に/氵  =  栖
  -  に/氵 + 比 + に/氵  =  湮
  -  か/金 + 比 + に/氵  =  甄
  -  ひ/辶 + 比 + に/氵  =  迺

Compounds of 母 and 毋

  -  心 + 比  =  苺
  -  ふ/女 + 比 + は/辶  =  姆
  -  て/扌 + 比 + は/辶  =  拇
  -  心 + 比 + は/辶  =  栂
  -  ね/示 + 比 + は/辶  =  袰

Compounds of 入 and 出

  -  れ/口 + 比 + な/亻  =  叺
  -  つ/土 + 比 + な/亻  =  圦
  -  き/木 + 比 + な/亻  =  杁
  -  れ/口 + 比 + へ/⺩  =  咄
  -  ら/月 + 比 + へ/⺩  =  朏
  -  き/木 + 比 + へ/⺩  =  柮
  -  ね/示 + 比 + へ/⺩  =  祟
  -  の/禾 + 比 + へ/⺩  =  糶
  -  し/巿 + 比 + へ/⺩  =  黜

Compounds of 互, 亙, 凸, 凹, 良, 貫, 可, 大, 小, 尺, 屯, 斗, 斤, 升, 丈, 勺, and 匁

  -  氷/氵 + 比 + ⺼  =  冱
  -  に/氵 + 比 + ⺼  =  沍
  -  ら/月 + 比 + や/疒  =  朖
  -  へ/⺩ + 比 + や/疒  =  琅
  -  の/禾 + 比 + や/疒  =  粮
  -  心 + 比 + や/疒  =  莨
  -  み/耳 + 比 + や/疒  =  踉
  -  き/木 + 比 + つ/土  =  樌
  -  え/訁 + 比 + け/犬  =  奕
  -  せ/食 + 比 + け/犬  =  奠
  -  そ/馬 + 比 + け/犬  =  尖
  -  さ/阝 + 比 + そ/馬  =  隙
  -  れ/口 + 比 + た/⽥  =  呎
  -  か/金 + 比 + た/⽥  =  鈬
  -  に/氵 + 比 + ふ/女  =  沌
  -  か/金 + 比 + ふ/女  =  瓲
  -  さ/阝 + 比 + ふ/女  =  邨
  -  せ/食 + 比 + ふ/女  =  飩
  -  て/扌 + 比 + と/戸  =  抖
  -  囗 + 比 + と/戸  =  斛
  -  も/門 + 比 + と/戸  =  斟
  -  む/車 + 比 + と/戸  =  蚪
  -  れ/口 + 比 + を/貝  =  听
  -  つ/土 + 比 + を/貝  =  圻
  -  る/忄 + 比 + を/貝  =  忻
  -  に/氵 + 比 + を/貝  =  沂
  -  か/金 + 比 + を/貝  =  釿
  -  き/木 + 比 + く/艹  =  枡
  -  な/亻 + 比 + 火  =  仗
  -  ふ/女 + 比 + も/門  =  妁
  -  き/木 + 比 + も/門  =  杓
  -  火 + 比 + も/門  =  灼
  -  心 + 比 + も/門  =  芍
  -  せ/食 + 比 + も/門  =  酌

Compounds of 里, 高, 可, and 亀

  -  た/⽥ + 比 + ⺼  =  疉
  -  い/糹/#2 + 比 + 囗  =  雋
  -  な/亻 + 比 + り/分  =  俚
  -  れ/口 + 比 + り/分  =  哩
  -  に/氵 + 比 + り/分  =  浬
  -  け/犬 + 比 + り/分  =  狸
  -  ね/示 + 比 + り/分  =  裡
  -  そ/馬 + 比 + り/分  =  貍
  -  ち/竹 + 比 + り/分  =  霾
  -  れ/口 + 比 + え/訁  =  嚆
  -  つ/土 + 比 + え/訁  =  塙
  -  や/疒 + 比 + え/訁  =  嵩
  -  は/辶 + 比 + え/訁  =  敲
  -  き/木 + 比 + え/訁  =  槁
  -  そ/馬 + 比 + え/訁  =  犒
  -  の/禾 + 比 + え/訁  =  稾
  -  心 + 比 + え/訁  =  蒿
  -  か/金 + 比 + え/訁  =  鎬
  -  う/宀/#3 + 比 + え/訁  =  髞
  -  か/金 + 比 + か/金  =  哥
  -  ゆ/彳 + 比 + か/金  =  彁
  -  き/木 + 比 + か/金  =  柯
  -  へ/⺩ + 比 + か/金  =  珂
  -  ふ/女 + 比 + か/金  =  舸
  -  く/艹 + 比 + か/金  =  苛
  -  に/氵 + 比 + か/金  =  渮
  -  え/訁 + 比 + か/金  =  訶
  -  む/車 + 比 + か/金  =  軻
  -  の/禾 + 比 + め/目  =  穐
  -  ほ/方 + 比 + め/目  =  鼇
  -  氷/氵 + 比 + め/目  =  鼈
  -  比 + 比 + め/目  =  龜
  -  も/門 + 比 + め/目  =  鬮

Other compounds

  -  ⺼ + 比  =  肘
  -  比 + ん/止  =  低
  -  仁/亻 + 比  =  化
  -  く/艹 + 比  =  花
  -  つ/土 + く/艹 + 比  =  埖
  -  き/木 + く/艹 + 比  =  椛
  -  ま/石 + く/艹 + 比  =  硴
  -  の/禾 + く/艹 + 比  =  糀
  -  か/金 + く/艹 + 比  =  錵
  -  を/貝 + 比  =  貨
  -  え/訁 + 仁/亻 + 比  =  訛
  -  と/戸 + 仁/亻 + 比  =  靴
  -  へ/⺩ + 比  =  奨
  -  selector 4 + へ/⺩ + 比  =  獎
  -  へ/⺩ + へ/⺩ + 比  =  奬
  -  比 + ゆ/彳  =  優
  -  比 + せ/食  =  鶴
  -  れ/口 + 比 + し/巿  =  吋
  -  ろ/十 + 比 + し/巿  =  尅
  -  る/忄 + 比 + し/巿  =  忖
  -  の/禾 + 比 + な/亻  =  糴
  -  い/糹/#2 + 比 + し/巿  =  紂
  -  せ/食 + 比 + し/巿  =  酎

Notes

Braille patterns